Vadakkummuri is a village in Thrissur district in the state of Kerala, India.

Demographics
 India census, Vadakkummuri had a population of 9532 with 4303 males and 5229 females residing in their country.

References

Villages in Thrissur district